Mariana Yolanda Ochoa Reyes (born February 19, 1979 in Mexico City) is a Mexican singer and actress.

Music career
She was a member of the musical group La Onda Vaselina, who were one of the most successful pop bands of Mexico, OV7. She stayed in the group until they dissolved in 2003. After OV7 was eventually dissolved, Mariana began dedicating herself to acting and singing.

Acting career
Ochoa's first major role was in the soap opera La Hija del Jardinero (2003–2004), a TV Azteca production. The soap opera was well received in Latin America.

Mariana did another major role in Amor Sin Condiciones, a remake of the successful soap opera Secreto de Amor which was produced in 2001 by Venevisión and Fonovideo in Miami.

In 2007, Ochoa appeared in the series Se Busca un Hombre.

Filmography

Discography

Studio albums

OV7 discography
1989: La Onda Vaselina
1990: Susanita Tiene Un Raton
1991: La Onda Vaselina 2
1992: Dulces Para Ti
1993: La Banda Rock
1995: Hoy
1997: Entrega Total
1998: Vuela Mas Alto
2000: CD00
2001: En Directo Rush
2001: Siete Latidos
2003: Punto

Ochoa released one studio album on EMI (Yo Soy) in 2004 and one studio album on Warner Music (Luna Llena) in 2007.

On March, 2006, Ochoa change of label company with Warner Music by ten years to recorded her next albums. In July, 2007, Ochoa record her second studio album named Luna Llena.

Singles

References

External links
Official web site
 

1979 births
Living people
21st-century Mexican actresses
20th-century Mexican women singers
21st-century Mexican women singers
Mexican telenovela actresses
Mexican people of Basque descent
Warner Music Latina artists